Limerick Pride is a week-long annual event in Limerick, Ireland. Although its history dates back to 2001, with the first official pride event, the Pride parade was not introduced until 2007.

The Pride parade took place in September from 2007 until 2013. It was moved to July in 2014 to avoid clashing with the Royal de Luxe event in September that year. The festival was made a week-long event in 2008. The final event of the week, the "Climax Party", is held in Dolan's Warehouse, with performers such as Leanne Moore (2008), Niamh Kavanagh (2010), Jujubee (2019), and Courtney Act (2002) headlining.

In 2008, the Pride parade had its first Grand Marshal, Alternative Miss Ireland winner Sheila Fitspatrick, and her partner Madonna Lucia. Other Grand Marshals have included actor Myles Breen (2015), Broden Giambrone (2016), Moninne Griffith, Executive Director of BeLonG To (2019), and Sharon Slater (2022).

During the lockdown period (2020-2021), virtual pride were provided. The annual "Tea Dance" with actor Myles Breen continued through this medium. 

In 2022, a new event was introduced, an inter-county Association football match between Limerick and Clare, to highlight women in sport. Limerick won the inaugural game. Also that year, two rainbow road crossings were installed in Limerick.

See also 

 List of LGBT events
 LGBT rights in the Republic of Ireland

References

External links 

 Limerick Pride – official website

LGBT events in Ireland
Pride parades in Europe
Parades in Ireland
Summer events in the Republic of Ireland